Ten Songs, Ten Years, Ten Days is a studio album released by the Canadian band Tokyo Police Club on October 11, 2011 through Dine Alone in Canada and Mom + Pop in the USA. The album consists of 10 covers of songs from 10 different years, recorded in 10 days.

Track listing

References

Tokyo Police Club albums
2011 albums
Covers albums